The 19th parallel south is a circle of latitude that is 19 degrees south of the Earth's equatorial plane. It crosses the Atlantic Ocean, Africa, the Indian Ocean, Australasia, the Pacific Ocean and South America.

Around the world
Starting at the Prime Meridian and heading eastwards, the parallel 19° south passes through:

{| class="wikitable plainrowheaders"
! scope="col" width="125" | Co-ordinates
! scope="col" | Country, territory or sea
! scope="col" | Notes
|-
| style="background:#b0e0e6;" | 
! scope="row" style="background:#b0e0e6;" | Atlantic Ocean
| style="background:#b0e0e6;" |
|-
| 
! scope="row" | 
|
|-
| 
! scope="row" | 
|
|-
| 
! scope="row" | 
|
|-
| 
! scope="row" | 
| 
|-
| style="background:#b0e0e6;" | 
! scope="row" style="background:#b0e0e6;" | Indian Ocean
| style="background:#b0e0e6;" | Mozambique Channel
|-
| 
! scope="row" | 
| Passing just south of Antananarivo
|-
| style="background:#b0e0e6;" | 
! scope="row" style="background:#b0e0e6;" | Indian Ocean
| style="background:#b0e0e6;" |
|-valign="top"
| 
! scope="row" | 
| Western Australia Northern Territory Queensland
|-valign="top"
| style="background:#b0e0e6;" | 
! scope="row" style="background:#b0e0e6;" | Coral Sea
| style="background:#b0e0e6;" | Passing between Rattlesnake Island and Acheron Island, Queensland,  Passing just north of Marion Reef in 's Coral Sea Islands Territory Passing just north of the Chesterfield Islands, 
|-
| 
! scope="row" | 
| Southernmost tip of Erromango island
|-
| style="background:#b0e0e6;" | 
! scope="row" style="background:#b0e0e6;" | Pacific Ocean
| style="background:#b0e0e6;" |
|-
| 
! scope="row" | 
| Kadavu island
|-
| style="background:#b0e0e6;" | 
! scope="row" style="background:#b0e0e6;" | Pacific Ocean
| style="background:#b0e0e6;" | Passing just north of Matuku Island, 
|-
| 
! scope="row" | 
| Totoya island
|-valign="top"
| style="background:#b0e0e6;" | 
! scope="row" style="background:#b0e0e6;" | Pacific Ocean
| style="background:#b0e0e6;" | Passing just south of Kabara island,  Passing just north of Fulaga island,  Passing just south of Late island, 
|-
| 
! scope="row" | 
|
|-valign="top"
| style="background:#b0e0e6;" | 
! scope="row" style="background:#b0e0e6;" | Pacific Ocean
| style="background:#b0e0e6;" | Passing just south of Aitutaki island,  Passing just north of Manuae atoll,  Passing just south of Nengonengo atoll,  Passing just north of Manuhangi atoll,  Passing just north of Paraoa atoll,  Passing just south of Vahitahi atoll, 
|-
| 
! scope="row" | 
|
|-
| 
! scope="row" | 
| Passing just north of Sucre
|-valign="top"
| 
! scope="row" | 
| Mato Grosso do Sul Goiás Minas Gerais Espírito Santo
|-
| style="background:#b0e0e6;" | 
! scope="row" style="background:#b0e0e6;" | Atlantic Ocean
| style="background:#b0e0e6;" |
|}

See also
18th parallel south
20th parallel south

s19